The 2009 India Open Grand Prix Gold (officially known as the Yonex-Sunrise India Open 2009 for sponsorship reasons) was a badminton tournament which took place at G.M.C. Balayogi SATS Indoor Stadium in Hyderabad, Andhra Pradesh, India from 24 to 29 March 2009.

Men's singles

Seeds

 Lee Chong Wei (first round)
 Taufik Hidayat (champion)
 Chetan Anand (second round)
 Nguyễn Tiến Minh (second round)
 Andre Kurniawan Tedjono (quarter-finals)
 Andrew Smith (withdrew)
 Sairul Amar Ayob (third round)
 Lee Tsuen Seng (quarter-finals)
 Arvind Bhat (third round)
 Muhammad Hafiz Hashim (final)
 Carl Baxter (withdrew)
 Rajiv Ouseph (withdrew)
 Anup Sridhar (third round)
 Chong Wei Feng (second round)
 Parupalli Kashyap (first round)
 Anand Pawar (third round)

Finals

Women's singles

Seeds

 Pi Hongyan (champion)
 Saina Nehwal (quarter-finals)
 Wong Mew Choo (quarter-finals)
 Maria Kristin Yulianti (first round)
 Julia Wong Pei Xian (final)
 Yu Hirayama (semi-finals)
 Xing Aiying (first round)
 Lydia Cheah Li Ya (quarter-finals)

Finals

Men's doubles

Seeds

 Choong Tan Fook / Lee Wan Wah (champion)
 Chan Chong Ming / Chew Choon Eng (second round)
 Fernando Kurniawan / Lingga Lie (second round)
 Rupesh Kumar / Sanave Thomas (second round)
 Joko Riyadi / Candra Wijaya (semi-finals)
 Hoon Thien How / Lin Woon Fui (quarter-finals)
 Khoo Chung Chiat / Ong Soon Hock (quarter-finals)
 Naoki Kawamae / Shōji Satō (second round)

Finals

Women's doubles

Seeds

 Shinta Mulia Sari / Yao Lei (quarter-finals)
 Frances Liu / Vanessa Neo (second round)
 Jwala Gutta / Shruti Kurien (semi-finals)
 Laura Choinet / Weny Rahmawati (quarter-finals)

Finals

Mixed doubles

Seeds

 Yohan Hadikusumo Wiratama / Chau Hoi Wah (quarter-finals)
 Valiyaveetil Diju / Jwala Gutta (final)
 Flandy Limpele / Vita Marissa (champion)
 Baptiste Carême / Laura Choinet (second round)

Finals

References

External links
 Tournament Link

India Open (badminton)
India Open
2009 in Indian sport
India Open
Sports competitions in Hyderabad, India